Apecchio is a comune (municipality) in the Province of Pesaro e Urbino in the Italian region Marche, located about  west of Ancona and about  southwest of Pesaro.
It lies on the border between Marche and Umbria and is crossed by the Biscubio and Menatoio rivers.
The territory is characterized by a morphology marked by medium-sized hills covered by extensive forests alternating with green meadows, crossed by deep valleys where numerous streams flow, some of which are sulphurous. 
The ruins scattered in the territory testify to signs of civilizations settled since ancient times. In its territory there is the enclave of Monte Ruperto, part of the municipality of Città di Castello (PG).

The base economy of Apecchio is mostly based on small-scale handicraft, agriculture, lumber but the production of fine truffles that the town celebrates with a big party at the beginning of October each year, should not be underestimated. However, it is the tourism sector that in recent years has experienced greater development. This is thanks to the clean and uncontaminated nature found here, and to the nearby ski slopes of Monte Nerone, leading to the creation of numerous holiday farms in addition to the classic holiday services already present. In addition to the aforementioned activities, there are three craft beer breweries: Collesi, Amarcord and Venere and one for grappa, and finally Val di Meti, a mineral water plant. These companies export their products around the world.

Origins of name
The current name of Apecchio has a rather controversial origin. Many date it back to the early Middle Ages and seems to derive from apiculum (small apex), apicula (small ape), or ager pecoris (cattle field). Some others instead believe that the name of the town derives from the ancient idiom urbinate apecchio (catapecchia).

History
The signs left by the past suggest the presence of Celtic, Etruscan, Umbrian and Roman settlements, but the most evidence come from the Middle Ages. The first written document regarding Apecchio dates back to 1077 and testifies to the dominion over it by the bishop-count of Città di Castello. The control by the Umbrian city lasted until the thirteenth century, when, after long struggles, the Ubaldini della Carda family from the nearby Carda castle prevailed on the town. This noble lineage brought the town into the duchy of Urbino which maintained direct control over it. In 1514 the territory of Apecchio was elevated to the title of county and governed by its own laws until 1752, when the male branch of the Ubaldini family died out with Frederick II (1745–52). The Holy See regained direct control over the territory, occupying it immediately. It remained under The Holy See, except during the French occupation of the Napoleonic age, up to the unification of Italy in the 19th century.
In 1943 Apecchio was, along with most of the rest of Italy, occupied by Hitler's German forces and suffered greatly under their rule until liberated by British forces.

Main sights
Santa Lucia, a newly discovered and authenticated 11th century Knights Templar church.
The Campanone ("Big Bell"), a bell tower with a watch dating to the 15th century.
Palazzo Ubaldini (15th century), with a notable courtyard from 1515 with Ionic-style columns. It houses a fossil and minerals museum as well as a museum with ancient relics found locally and details on how Old Apechio looked when it was a walled city. Its initial design was by Francesco di Giorgio Martini.
Ponte di Ghighetta, medieval humpback bridge (14th century) that featured in Raphael's painting, Madonna of the Goldfinch.
Church of Madonna della Vita, with a 15th-century wooden crucifix.
Jewish Quarter.
Apecchio is also home to the Globe of Peace, which was until 1999 the world's largest rotating globe.

References

External links
 Official Website
 Apecchio.net Blog
 Subreddit of Apecchio

Cities and towns in the Marche